opened in Naha, Okinawa Prefecture, Japan in 1910. Iha Fuyū was the first director. The library reopened in a new building in 1983. As of 2016, the collection numbers some 708,000 items, of which almost a fifth are on open access.

See also

 List of libraries in Japan
 Okinawa Prefectural Museum
 Okinawa Prefectural Archives

References

External links 
   
  Digital Archive

Libraries in Japan
Naha
Libraries established in 1910